The Macchi M.18 was a flying boat designed by Alessandro Tonini and produced by Macchi in Italy in the early 1920s. Originally planned as a passenger aircraft, it entered production as a bomber before eventually being offered on the civil market that it was originally intended for.

Design and development
A conventional design for World War I, the M.18 was a biplane flying boat with unstaggered wings of unequal span braced by Warren truss-style struts. The engine was mounted pusher-fashion in the interplane gap, and the pilot and observer sat in side-by-side open cockpits. An open position was provided in the bow for a gunner.

In addition to the standard military version, a version with folding wings was produced for shipboard use as the M.18AR. This equipped the Italian Navy's seaplane tender Giuseppe Miraglia and the Spanish Navy's Dédalo. The latter service used the type in action against Moroccan rebels. Six of the 20 machines purchased by Spain remained in service at the outbreak of the Spanish Civil War and were used to attack Nationalist forces on Majorca as well as flying reconnaissance patrols. Portugal also operated the type, buying eight examples in 1928.

The Paraguayan government bought two Macchi M.18AR in late 1932 for the naval aviation wing. They received the serials R.3 and R.5 and were intensively used in the Chaco War (1932–1935). Both fulfilled many reconnaissance and bombing missions in the North Front during the war. The first aerial night bombing was done by R.5 on December 22, 1934. R.3 was destroyed in an accident at the end of the war and R.5 was in service until the mid-1940s.

Three civil versions were eventually produced. The first of these, the M.18 Economico ("Commercial"), was generally similar to the military version, but was followed by the M.18 Lusso ("Luxury") which featured an enclosed cabin. The M.18 Estivo ("Summertime") again reverted to open cockpits. Some 70 civil examples were produced in all, some being purchased by joyriding firms such as Ad Astra Aero in Switzerland and some others being used by SISA for training flying boat pilots for airline service in the Adriatic.

Variants
M.18 Standard bomber version.
M.18AR With folding wings for shipboard use.
M.18 Economico (Commercial) Civil version generally similar to the Military bomber.
M.18 Lusso (Luxury) Enclosed cabin VIP transport.
M.18 Estivo (Summertime) Open cockpit for joyriding.

Operators

Ecuadorian Air Force

Regia Marina

Paraguayan Navy

Portuguese Navy

Spanish Republican Air Force
Spanish Republican Navy

Spanish Air Force
Spanish Navy

Specifications (M.18 AR)

See also

References

Notes

Bibliography

 
 
 Sapienza Fracchia, Antonio Luis: "La Contribución Italiana en la Aviación Paraguaya". Author's edition. Asunción, 2007. 300 pp.

M.18
1920s Italian bomber aircraft
Flying boats
Single-engined pusher aircraft
Biplanes
Aircraft first flown in 1920